A Viuvinha is a 1914 Brazilian silent romantic drama film directed by Luiz de Barros and starring Linda Bianchi and Gita de Barros.

Cast
Linda Bianchi 		
Gita de Barros 
Luiz de Barros 		
Fausto Muniz

References

External links
 

1914 films
Brazilian silent films
Brazilian black-and-white films
Films directed by Luiz de Barros
Brazilian romantic drama films
1914 romantic drama films
Silent romantic drama films